When it was first established under the guise of the Hadley Falls Company, the city of Holyoke, Massachusetts was conceived as a production center for textiles. Despite protests of the company during the formation of the Parsons Paper Company, that a pulp and paper venture was a poor use of space and unprofitable, by 1885 the city was the largest producer of paper goods in the United States. Before 1920 the city was the home to numerous paper mills, producing 80% of the writing paper used in the United States, as well as having the largest silk, and alpaca wool mills in the world. The city was also home to the largest paper millwright firm in the United States, D. H. & A. B. Tower, which would design at least 25 such mills in Holyoke alone. While many were lost to fire, redevelopment, and salvaging, today a number of mills have been redeveloped.

Extant

Demolished

See also
Holyoke Canal System
Holyoke Dam
List of mills in Fall River, Massachusetts
List of mills in New Bedford, Massachusetts
List of mills in Oldham

References

External links
 CT River: Holyoke Mills, WWLP 20 News, July 28, 2015

History of Massachusetts
 
Holyoke
Pulp and paper mills in the United States
Mills Holyoke